Sulev Nõmmik (11 January 1931, in Tallinn – 28 July 1992, in Kuressaare) was an Estonian theatre and movie director, actor, humorist and comedian. He's mostly associated with the comical character of Kärna Ärni and the related fictional village of Uduvere (roughly translated as Foggyshire), but he was also influential in writing scripts for several well-known movies, including Mehed ei nuta, Siin me oleme! and Noor pensionär.

Awards
In 1988, Sulev Nõmmik was awarded the Meie Mats.

References

External links

1931 births
1992 deaths
Male actors from Tallinn
Estonian male film actors
Estonian film directors
Estonian comedians
Recipients of Meie Mats
20th-century Estonian male actors
20th-century comedians